Claude Giroux (born January 12, 1988) is a Canadian professional ice hockey forward and alternate captain for the Ottawa Senators of the National Hockey League (NHL). He has previously played for the Philadelphia Flyers and the Florida Panthers. Selected by the Flyers 22nd overall in the 2006 NHL Entry Draft, Giroux was named the Flyers' team captain in 2013, and became the longest-tenured captain in team history. Giroux played his 1,000th game with the Flyers on March 17, 2022. Giroux has been known to be a very flexible offensive player; capable of playing comfortably on both center and wing throughout his career.

Before playing in the NHL, Giroux played his major junior career with the Gatineau Olympiques of the Quebec Major Junior Hockey League (QMJHL), where he helped the team win a 2008 President's Cup and earned the Guy Lafleur Trophy as the 2008 playoff MVP. Internationally, he won a gold medal with Team Canada in the 2008 World Junior Ice Hockey Championships.

Giroux made his debut with the Flyers in February 2008 and joined the roster full-time midway through the 2008–09 season. In 2011, after the trades of Mike Richards and Jeff Carter, Giroux took over the role of the club's first-line centre. He was the club's top point-scorer for seven seasons. In 2012 and 2014, he finished third in the league in point scoring. In 2018, he finished second in the league with 102 points, behind only Connor McDavid.

Early life
Giroux was born on January 12, 1988, in Hearst, Ontario, a Francophone town, and is fluent in both English and French. He is the son of Raymond and Nicole Giroux, and has one sister named Isabelle. Giroux and his family were supporters of the Montreal Canadiens, but his favourite hockey player growing up was Pavel Bure.

In the summer of 2002, at the age of 14, Giroux and his family moved to Ottawa, Ontario, where he attended Béatrice-Desloges High School in the suburban community of Orléans. While living in Orléans, Giroux played Major Bantam AA and Minor Midget AA hockey for the Cumberland Barons, and was the club's leading scorer in the 2002–03 and 2003–04 seasons. After being passed over in the 2004 Ontario Hockey League (OHL) draft, Giroux played for the Cumberland Grads during the 2004–2005 season at age 16. Despite missing most of the season after contracting mononucleosis, Giroux scored 40 points across 48 games and was named the Canadian Junior Hockey League (CJHL)'s Rookie of the Year.

Playing career

Junior

A free agent, Giroux was invited to Gatineau Olympiques training camp for a walk-on tryout. He was signed shortly after. During his rookie season with the Olympiques, Giroux scored 39 goals for a total of 103 points in 69 games and was named Quebec Major Junior Hockey League (QMJHL)'s Rookie of the Year. He entered the 2006 NHL Entry Draft and was selected 22nd overall by the Philadelphia Flyers. The Flyers signed Giroux to an entry-level contract on July 23, 2007.

Giroux made his NHL debut when the Flyers visited the Ottawa Senators on February 19, 2008, recording no points and being the team's first shooter in the shootout. Sent back down to the Olympiques, he helped the club win the QMJHL Playoffs and earned himself the Guy Lafleur Trophy as MVP in the QMJHL Playoffs by scoring 17 goals and 34 assists in 19 playoff games, also setting a franchise record.

On February 20, 2019, Giroux's number 28 was retired with the Gatineau Olympiques.

Professional

Philadelphia Flyers (2008–2022)
After a disappointing training camp for the Flyers at the beginning of the 2008–09 season, Giroux was assigned to the team's American Hockey League (AHL) affiliate, the Philadelphia Phantoms. After acclimatizing to professional hockey, however, things turned around quickly; he was named Rookie of the Month for December for his eight goals and six assists in eight games played. He was then called up to the Flyers after the Christmas break and remained there throughout the rest of the season. On December 31, he recorded his first NHL point by assisting on a Jeff Carter goal in a win over the Vancouver Canucks. He suffered a mild concussion during the next game when Corey Perry of the Anaheim Ducks elbowed him in the head. Giroux finished the game but missed the next five; Perry was suspended for four games.

On January 27, 2009, Giroux scored his first NHL goal against goaltender Tomáš Vokoun and the Florida Panthers in a 3–2 loss. His first Stanley Cup playoff goal came in a 6–3 win in Game 3 of the 2009 Eastern Conference Quarterfinals against Marc-André Fleury of the Pittsburgh Penguins. The same game also saw him setting up a short-handed goal when he stole the puck in the corner of the Penguins zone and outworked their backcheck, skating past the back of their net twice protecting the puck while looking for incoming support in the form of Simon Gagné. Giroux ended the 2008–09 season with nine goals and 27 points in 42 games played.

The Flyers were an inconsistent team for the bulk of the 2009–10 season, which affected all of their players. Giroux spent a large amount of time centering James van Riemsdyk, the highly touted rookie winger that the Flyers had drafted second overall in 2007. The Flyers' fortunes, however, soon turned dramatically: they qualified for the 2010 playoffs on Giroux's game-winner in a shootout against the New York Rangers. Giroux was a major point producer in a first round of the playoffs, dismantling the second-seeded New Jersey Devils. The Flyers made an historic comeback from three games to none down against the Boston Bruins to win the next four and advance to the Eastern Conference Final, where they dominated the Montreal Canadiens. Giroux scored the winning goal in overtime against the Chicago Blackhawks in Game 3 of the 2010 Stanley Cup Final, but despite his continued production, the Flyers eventually lost in overtime in Game 6 of the Final. Giroux ended the post-season with 21 playoff points, cementing his reputation as an emerging young talent.

A month into the  season, the Flyers signed Giroux to a three-year, $11.25 million contract extension. The contract, which was signed on November 8, 2010, accounted for a $3.75 million cap hit annually. On January 11, 2011, Giroux was named to the 2011 NHL All-Star Game roster. He finished his break-out season with 25 goals and 51 assists in 82 games and scored a goal and 11 assists in 11 2011 playoff games, in which the Flyers defeated the Buffalo Sabres but were ultimately defeated by the Bruins. Giroux played his 200th career game on March 26, 2011, against the New York Islanders.

After the Flyers traded away Jeff Carter and Mike Richards in the 2011 off-season, Giroux took over the role as first line centre for the club. The trading of Richards and Carter also made him the second-longest tenured member of the Flyers. Giroux formed a new top line with Scott Hartnell and free agent acquisition Jaromír Jágr. Giroux led the League in point-scoring for much of the season, and was considered a favourite for the Hart Memorial Trophy for League MVP at the season's All-Star break. He finished the season, however, 16 points behind eventual Hart Trophy winner Evgeni Malkin. On April 13, 2012, Giroux recorded his first career hat trick during game two of the first round of the 2012 playoffs against Pittsburgh. He recorded six points during that same game, earning a Flyers record for most points during a single Stanley Cup playoff game. On May 7, 2012, Giroux received a one-game suspension for a hit to the head of New Jersey Devils forward Dainius Zubrus during Game 4 of the Eastern Conference Semi-finals. After the Flyers were eliminated by the Devils, Giroux ended the season as both the Flyers' top regular season point-scorer (93 points) and top playoff point scorer (17 points). After the Flyers' elimination, Giroux had surgery on both of his wrists; the right to repair torn cartilage, and the left to remove bone spurs. He later claimed that Sidney Crosby had repeatedly slashed his wrists during face-offs in the first round series against Pittsburgh. At the time news of the surgery was revealed, Giroux was still the playoffs' leading point scorer, even though his team had been eliminated two weeks earlier. On June 20, 2012, Giroux was named the cover athlete for NHL 13 at the NHL awards in Las Vegas; he became the first Philadelphia Flyer on an EA Sports NHL video game cover since Eric Lindros on NHL 99.

During the 2012–13 NHL lock-out, Giroux and Flyers teammate Daniel Brière played for Eisbären Berlin of the German Deutsche Eishockey Liga (DEL). In his ninth game in Germany, he suffered a neck and shoulder injury that was initially feared to be a concussion. He returned to North America and remained inactive through the remainder of the lock-out. After the lock-out ended, Giroux was named the 19th team captain in Flyers history on January 15, 2013, taking over for the indefinitely-injured Chris Pronger.

Giroux got off to a slow start once the shortened  season began. Missing linemates Jaromír Jagr, who signed with the Dallas Stars during free agency, and Scott Hartnell, who suffered a broken foot during the third game of the season, Giroux registered only seven points through the team's first 13 games. His season turned around once right winger Jakub Voráček, who was also struggling, was placed on his line. From February 12 through the end of the regular season, Giroux was the fourth-most productive player in the League, scoring ten goals and 30 assists for a total of 40 points during that span. He finished with 48 points in 48 games and new linemate Voráček finished with a career-high 22 goals. The team as a whole struggled, however, and the Flyers missed the playoffs for the first time since the  season. On July 5, 2013, Giroux signed an eight-year, $66.2 million contract extension to stay in Philadelphia. The entire Flyers team struggled out of the gate, as Philadelphia won just one of their first eight games. Giroux was no exception, and had a difficult start to the 2013–14 season. In his first 15 games, he put up just seven assists and failed to tally a goal. Eventually, the team's struggles ran their course and the Flyers' and Giroux's play seemed to revert to normal.

Giroux's year took another turn when it came down to the Olympic roster selection. He was one of the biggest names left off of the Canadian team. But since that point, Giroux picked up his play. As of April 12, he was third in the league in points and the Flyers were in third place in the Metropolitan Division. At the conclusion of the season, Giroux was nominated for the NHL's Hart Trophy and the Ted Lindsay Award, both of which he lost to Sidney Crosby.

During the 2015–16 season Giroux required surgery to repair hip and abdominal muscle injuries in May 2016. The following year, Giroux ended the season with 14 goals, which concluded a 3 season streak of 20-plus goal seasons. Giroux said the lack of numbers was due to him still recovering from the surgery in 2016.

Things began turning upwards for Giroux during the 2017–18 season, as he moved from center to wing. This allowed Sean Couturier to move up to the top line, and both players had career years as a result. He was named to the 2018 NHL All-Star Game for the fifth time in his career during this season. This also made him the first Flyers skater since John LeClair and Eric Lindros to be selected for the All-Star Game roster five or more times. On March 13, 2018, after the Philadelphia Eagles released Brent Celek, Giroux became the longest tenured professional athlete in Philadelphia. On March 20, 2018, Giroux passed Eric Lindros for 5th on the Flyers' all-time scoring list. He recorded an assist on Sean Couturier's goal to record point 660. Near the conclusion of the regular season, Giroux was nominated for the Bill Masterton Trophy, and was later awarded the Bobby Clarke Trophy and the Toyota Cup award. In the final game of the regular season, Giroux became the 6th player in Flyers franchise history to reach the 100-point mark in a season, recording a power-play goal in the second period of a 5–0 win against the New York Rangers. He was the first Flyers' player to reach 100 points in a season since Eric Lindros in 1995–96. Giroux helped the Flyers qualify for the 2018 Stanley Cup playoffs, where he recorded 3 points in 6 games in an eventual first round loss to the Pittsburgh Penguins. Following the season, Giroux was named a Second-Team NHL All-Star. He also finished 4th in the MVP voting. 

On January 26, 2021, in a match against the New Jersey Devils, Giroux recorded his 611th game played as Flyers team captain, beating Bobby Clarke's 1984 record. Giroux's iron man streak of 328 consecutive games ended on February 18, when he was unavailable to play a game against the New York Rangers due to a positive COVID-19 test. Giroux returned on February 24, and recorded three assists in the Flyers' 4–3 win against the New York Rangers.

On December 10, 2021, Giroux recorded his 334th career power play point with an assist on Sean Couturier's goal; in doing so, he passed Bobby Clarke's record for most power play points in Flyers history. On December 29, 2021, two days shy of the anniversary of his first NHL point, Giroux assisted on a James van Riemsdyk goal against the Seattle Kraken for his 600th career assist and 884th career point. He is the 10th active player to achieve 600 assists, and his points total surpassed Hall of Famer Bill Barber for second overall in Flyers' franchise history. With the Flyers having a poor 2021–22 season and his contract approaching expiration, the possibility of Giroux being traded in advance of the 2022 Stanley Cup playoffs became a major point of discussion in sports media. Giroux was named the captain of the Metropolitan Division team for the 2022 NHL All-Star Game, his seventh all-star game appearance, and was named MVP of the game after scoring two goals in the finals. Giroux scored his 900th NHL point in his 999th NHL game on March 13, 2022, a 4–3 loss to the Montreal Canadiens, while also passing Eric Lindros for eighth place on the Flyers' all-time goals list.

On March 17, 2022, Giroux played in his 1000th NHL game, a 5–4 home victory over the Nashville Predators. Mere days before the trade deadline, it was widely assumed that this would be his final game with the team. He was presented with a silver stick at a pre-game ceremony by Bobby Clarke, and named the first star of the game despite not registering a point. He became the 40th NHL player to play 1000 games with a single team, and only the second Flyer, after Clarke.

Florida Panthers (2022)
On March 19, 2022, Giroux was traded to the Florida Panthers along with a 2024 5th-round pick, Connor Bunnaman, and German Rubtsov in exchange for Owen Tippett, a 2024 first-round draft pick, and a 2023 third-round pick. He made his debut with the Panthers in a March 24 road game against the Montreal Canadiens, registering two assists in a 4–3 victory. He scored his first goal with his new team in an April 5 game against the Toronto Maple Leafs, where the Panthers rallied to a 7–6 victory in overtime after a 5–1 deficit in the second period. Giroux finished the regular season with 3 goals and 20 assists in 18 games, while the Panthers finished first in the league and won the Presidents' Trophy.

Entering the 2022 Stanley Cup playoffs as one of the favourites, the Panthers faced the Washington Capitals in the first round. Giroux played a pivotal role in the series-clinching win in Game 6, leading the team past the first round for the first time in a quarter century. In the second round matchup against the Tampa Bay Lightning, the Panthers were swept in four games, bringing the postseason run to an end. Following the defeat, Giroux said that he was contemplating re-signing with the Panthers.

Ottawa Senators (2022–present)
On July 13, 2022, Giroux signed a three-year, $19.5 million contract with the Ottawa Senators. He was announced as an alternate captain on September 19, 2022. Giroux recorded his 300th career goal in a November 5, 2022 game against his old team, the Flyers.

International play

Giroux competed with Team Canada in the IIHF World Junior Ice Hockey Championship in 2008. He scored two goals and four assists in seven games to help Canada win its fourth consecutive WJC. He competed with Team Canada in the IIHF World Championship in April 2013. He scored three goals and five assists in eight games.
In 2015, he was a member of Canada's gold medal-winning team at the World Hockey Championships. He competed with Team Canada in the 2015 IIHF World Championship, and was awarded Player of the Game in the team's victory  against Team Russia in the final game of the Championship.

Personal life
During the 2010–2011 season, Giroux lived with teammate Daniel Brière and Brière's three sons in their Haddonfield, New Jersey home. In 2011, Giroux moved out and into an apartment with teammate Brayden Schenn.

During the 2012–13 lockout, Giroux also made a voice appearance in the 2012 TV film, The Magic Hockey Skates (based on the book of the same name).

On July 1, 2014, Giroux was arrested by police in Ottawa after twice grabbing the buttocks of a male police officer while intoxicated inside an Ottawa nightclub. Though he reportedly spent the night in jail, no charges were laid.

In December 2016, Giroux became engaged to his longtime girlfriend Ryanne Breton and the two married in July 2018. Their son Gavin was born on August 26, 2019. The couple's second son, Palmer, was born August 5, 2021.

Records
Gatineau Olympiques – 51 points in 19 playoff games
Philadelphia Flyers – most points in a single Stanley Cup playoffs game (6)
 Philadelphia Flyers – most games played by a team captain (611)
 Philadelphia Flyers – most power play points (334)

Career statistics

Regular season and playoffs
Bold indicates led league

International

Awards and honours

QMJHL
Played in the 2005–06 CHL Top Prospects Game
QMJHL Rookie of the Month – December 2005 and March 2006
2005–06 QMJHL All-Rookie Team
QMJHL Offensive Player of the Month – September 2006
2008 President's Cup (QMJHL playoff champion) with Gatineau Olympiques
2008 Guy Lafleur Trophy (QMJHL playoff MVP)
2007–08 QMJHL First All-Star Team
2007–08 Canadian Major Junior First All-Star Team
Jersey number 28 retired by Gatineau Olympiques on February 20, 2019

AHL
AHL Rookie of the Month – December 2008

NHL
7× NHL All-Star Game – 2011, 2012, 2015, 2016, 2018, 2019, 2022
NHL Second All-Star Team – 2018
NHL All-Star Game MVP – 2022

Philadelphia Flyers
Bobby Clarke Trophy – 2011, 2012, 2014, 2016, 2018
Gene Hart Memorial Award – 2011
Toyota Cup (3 Stars Award) – 2012, 2013, 2014, 2015, 2016, 2018, 2021

Other
Named 2011 Pro Athlete of the Year by the Philadelphia Sports Writers Association
2012 recipient of the Philadelphia Sports Congress' John Wanamaker Athletic Award
Voted in as the cover athlete for EA Sports' NHL 13 video game
Game-winning goal against the Columbus Blue Jackets voted by Flyers fans as the team's "Highlight of the Year" during the 2013–14 season
Game-winning overtime goal against the Winnipeg Jets, along with the assist by Shayne Gostisbehere, voted by Flyers fans as the team's "Highlight of the Year" during the 2015–16 season
Named 2018 Saku Koivu Award (Comeback Player) recipient by The Hockey News

References

External links

1988 births
Living people
Canadian expatriate ice hockey players in Germany
Canadian expatriate ice hockey players in the United States
Canadian ice hockey centres
Canadian ice hockey forwards
Canadian ice hockey right wingers
Canadian people of French descent
Eisbären Berlin players
Florida Panthers players
Franco-Ontarian people
Gatineau Olympiques players
Ice hockey people from Ottawa
National Hockey League All-Stars
National Hockey League first-round draft picks
Ottawa Senators players
People from Haddonfield, New Jersey
People from Hearst, Ontario
Philadelphia Flyers captains
Philadelphia Flyers draft picks
Philadelphia Flyers players
Philadelphia Phantoms players
Sportspeople from Philadelphia